The 2019–20 season was Ulster's 26th season since the advent of professionalism in rugby union, and Dan McFarland's second season as head coach. Lock Iain Henderson was named captain in place of retired hooker Rory Best. They competed in the Pro14 and the European Rugby Champions Cup.

Academy players who made their debuts this season included centre Stewart Moore and wing Ethan McIlroy. In the Pro14, Ulster finished second in Conference A, making the playoffs and qualifying for next season's Champions Cup. They beat Edinburgh in the semi-final, but lost to Leinster in the final. Ulster led the league in defence. Scrum-half John Cooney and centre Stuart McCloskey made the Pro14 Dream Team. They finished second in Pool 3 in the Champions Cup, qualifying for the quarter-finals, where they were beaten by Toulouse. Cooney and number eight Marcell Coetzee were nominated for European Player of the Year. Cooney was leading scorer with 180 and leading try scorer with ten, and was named Ulster's Player of the Year.

Staff

Squad

Senior squad

Players in
 Sam Carter from  Brumbies
 Gareth Milasinovich from  Worcester Warriors
 Jack McGrath from  Leinster
 Matt Faddes from  Highlanders
 Bill Johnston from  Munster
 David O'Connor from  Lansdowne

Players out
 Alex Thompson to  Jersey Reds
 Darren Cave retired
 Rory Best retired
 Caleb Montgomery to  Worcester Warriors
 David Busby to  Seattle Seawolves
 Peter Nelson released
 Jack Owens released
 Johnny McPhillips to  Leicester Tigers

Academy squad
Six new players joined the academy this season: wing Aaron Sexton, from Bangor Grammar School; wing Conor Rankin, from Campbell College; hooker Tom Stewart, last seasons' Ulster Schools Player of the Season, from Belfast Royal Academy; Irish-qualified centre Hayden Hyde, from Harlequins academy; prop Callum Reid, from Banbridge RFC; and wing Ethan McIlroy, who joined in January 2020, from Methodist College Belfast.

Events
Ulster hooker and captain Rory Best retired after captaining Ireland in the 2019 Rugby World Cup. Also selected for the Ireland squad were Rob Herring, Iain Henderson, Jordi Murphy and Jacob Stockdale.

Iain Henderson was named the new captain of Ulster.

New arrivals were lock Sam Carter from the Brumbies, props Jack McGrath from Leinster and Gareth Milasinovich from Worcester Warriors, wing Matt Faddes from the Highlanders and out-half Bill Johnston from Munster. Rory Best and centre Darren Cave retired, lock Alex Thompson moved to Jersey Reds, loose forward Caleb Montgomery to Worcester Warriors, wing David Busby to the Seattle Seawolves, and out-half Johnny McPhillips to Leicester Tigers, while utility back Peter Nelson and wing Jack Owens were released.

Scrum coach Aaron Dundon, strength and conditioning coach Kevin Geary and GPS analyst Chris Hagan also left the province's support staff.

Academy players Stewart Moore, Azur Allison and Ethan McIlroy made their senior debuts this season.

Scrum-half Alby Mathewson and out-half Ian Madigan joined in the summer, and were able to play in the end-of-season games delayed by the COVID-19 pandemic. Ulster were docked a point in the Pro14 table as Madigan played two games before he was properly registered with his new club.

Ulster had the highest home attendance in the Pro14, averaging 15,295. They were fourth in the Champions Cup, averaging 17,024.

European Rugby Champions Cup

Pool 3

Quarter-final

End-of-season awards
Marcell Coetzee and John Cooney made the longlist for EPCR European Player of the Year.

Pro14

Semi-final

Final

End of season awards
Inside centre Stuart McCloskey and scrum-half John Cooney were named on the Pro14 Dream Team.

Ulster A

Celtic Cup

Final

Home attendance

Ulster Rugby Awards
The Ulster Rugby Awards ceremony was held on 29 September 2020. Winners were:

Player of the Year: John Cooney (nominees: Marcell Coetzee, Alan O'Connor, Sean Reidy)
Personality of the Year: Marcell Coetzee
Supporters' Club Player of the Year: Marcell Coetzee (nominees: John Cooney, Stuart McCloskey)
Rugby Writers' Player of the Year: Marcell Coetzee (nominees: John Cooney, Stuart McCloskey)
Young Player of the Year: Tom O'Toole (nominees: Robert Baloucoune, James Hume, Michael Lowry)
Ulster A Player of the Year: Ethan McIlroy (nominees: Ross Adair, Hayden Hyde)
Academy Player of the Year: David McCann (nominees: Ethan McIlroy, Lewis Finlay)
Women's Player of the Year - Kathryn Dane (nominees: Vicky Irwin, Neve Jones)
Referee of the Year: Chris Busby
Dorrington B. Faulkner (Services to Rugby) Award: Ross Workman, Omagh Academicals RFC
Youth Player of the Year: Jack Milton, Ballyclare RFC
U18 Girls' Player of the Year: Ava Fannin, RFC Virginia
Girls Schools' Player of the Year: Lucy Thompson, Enniskillen Royal Grammar School
Boys Schools' Player of the Year: Nathan Doak, Wallace High School
Club Player of the Year: Shea O'Brien, City of Armagh RFC

References

External links
Ulster Rugby: Who Did What 2019-20, The Front Row Union, 1 October 2020
"The Ulster depth chart: Madigan and Mathewson add experience", The42, 29 July 2020

2019-20
2019–20 in Irish rugby union
2019–20 Pro14 by team
2019–20 European Rugby Champions Cup by team